Cyprus competed in the 2014 Commonwealth Games in Glasgow, Scotland from July 23 to August 3, 2014.

Athletics

Men

Field Events

Women

Field events

Cycling

Mountain biking

Road

Women

Gymnastics

Artistic
Men

Individual all around final

Women

Rhythmic
Individual 

Individual finals

Judo

Men

Shooting

Men
Shotgun

Women
Pistol

Shotgun

Swimming

Men

Women

Weightlifting

Men

Women

References

Nations at the 2014 Commonwealth Games
Cyprus at the Commonwealth Games
2014 in Cypriot sport